An electro-diesel multiple unit (EDMU) or bi-mode multiple unit (BMU) is a form of a multiple unit that can be powered either by electric power picked up from the overhead lines or third rail (like an electric multiple unit – EMU) or by using an onboard diesel engine, driving an electric generator, which produces AC or DC electric power (like a diesel-electric multiple unit – DEMU).

List of BMUs

Asia

China
Two variants of the China Railway CR200J-SG Fuxing (HXD1D-J and FXN3-J) high-speed train are electro-diesel (bi-mode) multiple units specifically designed for plateau operation. They are HXD1D-J manufactured by CRRC Zhuzhou Locomotive and FXN3-J manufactured by CRRC Dalian. Two variants are served on Sichuan–Tibet railway.

Oceania

Australia 
NSW TrainLink Regional Train Project is building 117 bi-mode carriages (1.5kV DC) to replace its diesel fleet of interstate and regional XPT, Xplorer and  Endeavour trainsets to be delivered by CAF from 2023.

Europe

France

Bombardier has built dual-mode variants of its AGC series for the French operator SNCF; the electricity is collected by means of a pantograph.

 B 81500 – multiple unit trains using  catenary. In service since 2005.
 B 82500 – multiple unit trains using both  and  AC catenary. In service since October 2007.
 Alstom Règiolis (B 83500, B 84500, B 85000, B 85900). In service since April 2014 (B 83500 and B 84500).

Italy
 BTR 813, first electro-diesel version of the Stadler Flirt, service in the Valle d'Aosta region since October 2019.

Netherlands
 18 bi-mode units of the Stadler WINK have entered service in 2021 with Arriva Netherlands. In addition to electric and diesel propulsion, these trains can also run on battery power.

Norway
 14 bi-modal variants of the Stadler Flirt trains, called  in Norway, held by the state owned Norske Tog and operated by the line operator SJ AB (as SJ Nord) entering service in 2021.

Poland

 Newag Impuls is offered in electro-diesel (hybrid) version. First units were delivered to West Pomeranian Voivodeship and started regular revenue service in early 2021.

Russia 
 DT1 (ДТ1) Russian-gauge multiple unit. In service since 2009.

United Kingdom

Electro-diesel multiple units whose electricity source is  overhead line include:

 British Rail Class 800 – high-speed multiple unit for use on Great Western Railway and London North Eastern Railway inter-city services. In service since October 2017.
 British Rail Class 802 – high-speed multiple unit for use on Great Western Railway, Hull Trains and TransPennine Express inter-city services. In service since August 2018.
 British Rail Class 805 – high-speed multiple unit for use on West Coast Main Line Avanti West Coast services to Shrewsbury and the North Wales Coast Line, replacing Class 221s
 British Rail Class 768 – multiple unit converted from Class 319 (with external dual-system/voltage support), for use by Rail Operations Group on parcel services.
 British Rail Class 769 – multiple unit converted from Class 319 (with external dual-system/voltage support), for use on Great Western Railway, Northern and Transport for Wales regional services. Introduction from December 2019.
 British Rail Class 755 – multiple unit for use on Greater Anglia regional services. In service since July 2019 (755/4).

See also
 Electro-diesel locomotive

References

Multiple units
Hybrid_multiple_units